Izaac Thompson (born 3 October 1996) is a New Zealand professional rugby league footballer who plays as a er for the South Sydney Rabbitohs in the NRL.

Playing career

2022
Thompson made his first grade debut in round 21 of the 2022 NRL season for South Sydney against the New Zealand Warriors, scoring a try.

References

External links
Rabbitohs profile

1996 births
Living people
New Zealand rugby league players
New Zealand sportspeople of Tongan descent
Rugby league wingers
South Sydney Rabbitohs players